János Kajdi (30 December 1939 – 10 April 1992) was a boxer from Hungary. He competed at the 1964, 1968 and 1972 Olympics in the lightweight, light-welterweight and welterweight (– 67 kg) division, respectively, and won a silver medal in 1972. In the final he was defeated by Cuba's Emilio Correa on points (5:0).

1964 Olympic results
Below are the results of János Kajdi, a lightweight boxer form Hungary, who competed at the 1964 Tokyo Olympics:

 Round of 64: bye
 Round of 32: defeated Ram Prasad Gurung (Nepal) referee stopped contest
 Round of 16: defeated Alex Odhiambo (Uganda) by decision, 5-0
 Quarterfinal: lost to Velikton Barannikov (Soviet Union) referee stopped contest

1968 Olympic results
Below are the results of János  Kajdi, a light welterweight boxer form Hungary, who competed at the 1968 Mexico City Olympics:

 Round of 64: bye
 Round of 32: lost to Jerzy Kulej (Poland) by decision, 2-3

1972 Olympic results
Below are the results of János Kajdi, a welterweight boxer form Hungary, who competed at the 1972 Munich Olympics:

Round of 32: Defeated James Vrij (Netherlands) by decision, 4–1
Round of 16: Defeated Damdinjavyn Bandi (Mongolia) by a second-round knockout
Quarterfinal: Defeated Maurice Hope (Great Britain) by decision, 5–0
Semifinal: Defeated Richard Murunga (Kenya) by decision, 4–1
Final: Lost to Emilio Correa (Cuba) by decision, 0–5 (was awarded the silver medal)

References
 

1939 births
1992 deaths
Welterweight boxers
Olympic boxers of Hungary
Boxers at the 1964 Summer Olympics
Boxers at the 1968 Summer Olympics
Boxers at the 1972 Summer Olympics
Olympic silver medalists for Hungary
Olympic medalists in boxing
Hungarian male boxers
Medalists at the 1972 Summer Olympics
Sportspeople from Szombathely
20th-century Hungarian people